Benthobia atafona is a species of sea snail, a marine gastropod mollusc in the family Benthobiidae.

Description

Distribution
This species occurs in the Atlantic Ocean off Southeast Brazil.

References

 Simone, L. R., 2003. Revision of the genus Benthobia (Caenogastropoda, Pseudolividae). Journal of Molluscan Studies 69: 245-162

Benthobiidae
Gastropods described in 2003